

Events

January events
 January 1 – The Companhia dos Caminhos de Ferro Portugueses is reconstituted and takes over concessions of most private railway companies in Portugal.
 January 19 – The Baltimore and Ohio Railroad inaugurates the Cincinnatian passenger train between Baltimore, Maryland, and Cincinnati, Ohio.

February events
 February 1 – William Neal succeeds D'Alton Corry Coleman as president of Canadian Pacific Railway.
 February 18 – Pennsylvania Railroad's Red Arrow passenger train derails at Gallatin, Pennsylvania; 24 people are killed in the accident.
 February 25 – Hachikō Line derailment: The worst-ever train accident in Japan kills 184 people.
 February 28 – The Illinois Central Railroad withdraws the Illinois Central 121 streamlined trainset from the Green Diamond Chicago-St. Louis service.

March events
 March 4 – Ms. Friedel Klussman launches a drive to preserve the San Francisco cable car system.

April events
 April 7 – Ellis D. Atwood completes the original Edaville Railroad on his cranberry plantation at South Carver, Massachusetts, United States. This  narrow gauge line, using equipment from Maine, is generally regarded as the world’s first tourist railroad.
 April 27 – After a complete overhaul, the Illinois Central 121 trainset re-enters active service, this time between Jackson, Mississippi, and New Orleans, Louisiana, as the Miss-Lou passenger train.

May events
 May – Baldwin Locomotive Works completes the last two steam locomotives built for the narrow gauge White Pass and Yukon Route.
 May 5 – Sixteen people die in the Camp Mountain train disaster when a crowded picnic train derails on a sharp left-hand curve between Ferny Grove and Camp Mountain stations on the now-closed Dayboro line, approximately 20 km(12.4 miles) northwest of Brisbane, Queensland, Australia.
 May 18 – Seaboard Air Line Railroad inaugurates the Silver Comet passenger train between New York City and Birmingham, Alabama.
 May 26 – General Motors Electro-Motive Division and Pullman-Standard's streamlined Train of Tomorrow enters demonstration passenger service in North America.
 May 31 – The Gulf, Mobile and Ohio Railroad acquires the Chicago and Alton Railroad.

June events
 June 6 – The Pere Marquette Railroad is merged into the Chesapeake and Ohio Railway.
 June 16 – The last passenger service is operated on the Nickey line.
 June 29 – The Milwaukee Road inaugurates the Olympian Hiawatha passenger train between Chicago, Illinois and Tacoma, Washington. Simultaneously, the railroad revives the Columbian, operating on the same route.

July events
 July 1 – The Maine Central Railroad begins operation of EMD E7 locomotives with stainless steel passenger cars.

August events
 August 6 – The Transport Act 1947 is passed by the Parliament of the United Kingdom providing for the nationalisation of all major British railways in 1948.

 August 14–15 – The Partition of India leads to transfer of large parts of the North Western, Bengal Assam and Jodhpur Railways to a new Pakistan Railways organisation, and large-scale population transfer between the two countries by rail. The Jammu–Sialkot Line is abandoned as a through route.

September events
 September 1 – Dugald, Manitoba, Canada:  A Canadian National Railway passenger train fails to take the siding and collides with the No. 4 Transcontinental that is standing on the main line.  Thirty-one people are killed.
 September 17 – The American Freedom Train, carrying the original versions of the United States Constitution, Declaration of Independence and the Bill of Rights, begins a two-year tour of the United States starting in Philadelphia, Pennsylvania.  See also American Freedom Train - 1947-1949 station stops

October events
 October 1 – The Chicago Transit Authority (CTA) begins operating the local transit (buses and 'L'-Subway rapid transit) systems in Chicago after acquiring the properties of the former Chicago Surface Lines and the Chicago Rapid Transit Company.
 October 18 – Alaska Railroad inaugurates the Aurora passenger train service between Fairbanks and Anchorage.

December events
 December 3 – French communist strikers derail the Paris-Tourcoing express train because of false rumours that it is transporting soldiers – 21 dead.

Unknown date events
 The first diesel locomotives enter mainline operation on the Southern Pacific Railroad.
 The Southern Pacific Railroad is reincorporated in Delaware.
 The City of Los Angeles train frequency is upgraded to daily.
 The Super Chief train frequency is upgraded to daily.
 Lima Locomotive Works is merged with General Machinery Corporation of Hamilton, OH. The new company is named Lima-Hamilton.
 The components of the former M-10002 streamliner trainset are scrapped.
 The last United States Fish and Wildlife Service fish car is taken out of service.
 The Richmond, Fredericksburg and Potomac Railroad inaugurates its Old Dominion passenger train between Washington, DC, and Richmond, Virginia.

Accidents

References